Épée was one of four s built for the French Navy around the beginning of the 20th century. During the First World War, the ship saw service in the Mediterranean Sea and survived the war to be stricken from the naval register on 1 October 1920.

Design and description
They displaced  at deep load. Their complement consisted of four officers and forty-four enlisted men.

The Framée-class ships were armed with a single  gun forward of the bridge and six  Hotchkiss guns, three on each broadside. They were fitted with two single  torpedo tubes, one between the funnels and the other on the stern. Two reload torpedoes were also carried.

Construction and career
Épée was ordered from Forges et Chantiers de la Méditerranée and the ship was laid down in 1897 at its shipyard in Granville-Le Havre. She was launched on 27 July 1900.

References

Bibliography

 

Framée-class destroyers
Ships built in France
1900 ships